The 2006 NAB AFL Under 18 Championships was the 11th edition of the AFL Under 18 Championships. Eight teams competed in the championships: Vic Metro, Vic Country, South Australia and Western Australia in Division 1, and New South Wales/Australian Capital Territory (NSW/ACT), Northern Territory, Queensland and Tasmania in Division 2. The competition was played over three rounds across two divisions. Vic Metro and Queensland were the Division 1 and Division 2 champions, respectively. The Larke Medal (for the best player in Division 1) was awarded to Victoria Metro's Tom Hawkins, and the Hunter Harrison Medal (for the best player in Division 2) was won by Queensland's Ricky Petterd.

Results

Division 1

Division 1 Ladder

Division 2

Division 2 Ladder

Under 18 All-Australian team
The 2006 Under 18 All-Australian team was named on 30 June 2006:

References

Under 18